GameDuell is a cross-platform games community headquartered in Berlin, Germany. It operates over 70 games in seven languages with over 130 million users. The company produces and distributes digital card and board games, action arcade games, as well as puzzle games for the web and social and mobile platforms. Some of the company's games include Fluffy Birds, Maya Pyramid, Bubble Speed, Jungle Jewels, Grand Gin Rummy and Belote.

History
GameDuell was founded in December 2003 by Kai Bolik, Michael Kalkowski and Boris Wasmuth. In 2008, GameDuell expanded into North America and opened an office in San Francisco. The company released its first Facebook game, Bubble Popp, in 2009 and its first iOS mobile game, Jungle Jewels, in 2010. Jungle Jewels was also released for Android in 2011.

By 2013, the company had produced more than 70 online games in German, French, English, Dutch, Swedish, Danish and Spanish, and had a user base of 80 million players.

In 2014, the company changed its logo to reflect "passion for game development and game experience." In February 2014, former PopCap studio director Todd English joined GameDuell as head of studio for social and mobile games, and Ian J. Bowden, co-founder of Rockstar Leeds, became art director at GameDuell in August 2014. While at Rockstar, Bowden worked on the Grand Theft Auto game series, L.A. Noire, Red Dead Redemption and Max Payne 3. GameDuell released the French card game Belote.com in 2014 with cross-platform functionality. Later that same year, GameDuell launched the Belote.com world tournaments ("Coupe Du Monde"). In June 2015, Howard Phillips became GameDuell's head of game design and user experience. Phillips previously worked for Nintendo, THQ, Microsoft, and was studio director at Chair Entertainment.

In March 2016, GameDuell released Grand Gin Rummy, its digital adaptation of the traditional gin rummy card game. The company's cross-platform game engine makes the game playable across iOS and Android smartphones and tablets. The game was additionally released on Facebook in April 2016.

GameDuell is a member of the industry association media.net Berlin Brandenburg and member of the German game developers association, GAME. As of July 2018, the company employs 150 people.

Funding
In 2004, GameDuell raised a funding round led by Holtzbrinck Ventures and Burda Digital Ventures. The company raised a $17 million in a second round of funding in July 2008 from Wellington Partners. The company was bought out by MPL in 2022.

Operations
GameDuell operates a dedicated cross-platform game server with an open cross-platform development toolkit written in programming language Haxe. By 2016, GameDuell had over 130 million users and 70 games produced in seven languages.

GameDuell Events 

GameDuell TechTalk

Since 2010, GameDuell hosts the TechTalk event series, where renowned technology pioneers share their know-how with the tech community of Berlin. Senior technology experts like Ed Burns, JSF specification lead at Oracle, Werner Vogels, CTO of Amazon, Emil Eifrem, Founder of Neo Technology, Dr. Torsten Lodderstedt, member of the OAuth working group of the Internet Engineering Task Force (IETF) and tech manager at Deutsche Telekom, Matthias Weßendorf, member of the Apache Software Foundation, working for JBoss/Red Hat and Jeanfrancois Arcand, developer of the Atmosphere framework, introduce the audience to their working fields.

Berlin 2.0

Twice a year GameDuell invites the one hundred most influential and successful founders of the Berlin startup community to an exclusive networking event. At Berlin 2.0 the founders of the most established tech and internet companies meet to exchange.

Skat & Rommé Masters

Since 2006 GameDuell hosts the largest Skat tournament of the world every year. The event series is organized in exclusive partnership with the German Skat Association (DSkV e.V.). Throughout the year players of the popular German card game compete in qualification rounds on the GameDuell web platform.  Additionally to the Skat Masters, GameDuell launched the Rommé Masters tournament series in 2009. Only the best players of both games qualify for the live finals in Berlin where they compete face-to-face for valuable trophies. The final round is recorded and televised on German TV.

References

External links 
 Company Website
 GameDuell Games Platform
 GameDuell TechTalk
 Grand Gin Rummy
 Belote.com

Video game companies of Germany
Companies based in Berlin